Ironbridge and Broseley railway station was a railway station with two through platforms on the Severn Valley Railway Line in Shropshire, England.

The station was on a section of the Severn Valley Line north of Bridgnorth and was demolished in 1966 to provide car parking space within the Severn Gorge. Until its closure on 25 November 1956, the signal box controlled railway traffic around the station and the level crossing that lead to the Iron Bridge.

Photographs of the station running-in board show the station name as "IRON-BRIDGE & BROSELEY" (with hyphen). The cast iron nameplate on the signal box read "IRON BRIDGE & BROSELEY SIGNAL BOX" (Iron and Bridge being separate words without hyphen). Although thought by some people to have been closed as part of the Beeching axe in 1963 its planned closure pre-dated his report.

Prior to its closure rationalisation took place in the form of closure of the signal box, removal of the upper portion and relocation of the token instruments to the Station Master's office in the main station building.

Virtually all traces of the station platforms, station building and goods shed have been swept away. A "pay and display" car park now occupies the site. There is also little or no trace of the signal box, there now being an electricity supply transformer at its former position.

Surviving artifacts
The astute observer can find those few traces of the site's former railway use. Two cast iron GWR ball top gate posts and one level crossing gate post survive along with rails in the roadway approaching the Ironbridge toll house. On the opposite side of the road an abutment of the footbridge visible in the accompanying photograph remains.

References

Further reading

Buildings and structures demolished in 1966
Disused railway stations in Shropshire
Former Great Western Railway stations
Railway stations in Great Britain opened in 1862
Railway stations in Great Britain closed in 1963
Ironbridge Gorge
1862 establishments in England